Jiang Enzhu (born 14 December 1938) is a Chinese retired diplomat and politician. Jiang was a member of the 15th CPC Central Committee, he served as Chinese ambassador to the United Kingdom, as president of the Xinhua News Agency, as director of the Liaison Office of the Central People's Government in the Hong Kong Special Administrative Region.

Biography
Jiang was born in Gaoyou, Jiangsu Province, China in December 1938, but grew up in Shanghai. He graduated from Beijing Foreign Studies University in 1964 with a degree in English. After graduation, he was assigned to work for the Chinese Embassy in the UK. In 1978, he was transferred to Ministry of Foreign Affairs of the People's Republic of China. In 1981, Jiang was sent to the United States to study by the Chinese Government, he studied in Harvard University and worked in the Brookings Institution. Jiang returned to China in 1983, then he worked in Ministry of Foreign Affairs of the People's Republic of China.

In July 1997, Jiang served as president of the Xinhua News Agency. In January 2000, Jiang served as director of the Liaison Office of the Central People's Government in the Hong Kong Special Administrative Region. In March 2003, he was elected a standing committee member of the 10th National People's Congress. He retired in March 2008.

References

1938 births
Living people
Chinese diplomats
Politicians from Yangzhou
Beijing Foreign Studies University alumni
Harvard University alumni
Delegates to the 9th National People's Congress from Hong Kong
Delegates to the 10th National People's Congress from Hong Kong
Members of the Standing Committee of the 10th National People's Congress
Members of the Standing Committee of the 9th National People's Congress
Members of the 15th Central Committee of the Chinese Communist Party
Xinhua News Agency people